The 1997 World Weightlifting Championships were held in Chiang Mai, Thailand from December 6 to December 14, 1997. In the men's tournament there were a total number of 189 athletes (51 nations) competing, while there were 143 women in action from 29 nations.

Medal summary

Men

Women

Medal table
Ranking by Big (Total result) medals 

Ranking by all medals: Big (Total result) and Small (Snatch and Clean & Jerk)

Team ranking

Men

Women

Participating nations
332 competitors from 58 nations competed.

 (1)
 (2)
 (4)
 (11)
 (3)
 (3)
 (2)
 (9)
 (7)
 (1)
 (19)
 (19)
 (1)
 (4)
 (4)
 (1)
 (11)
 (4)
 (4)
 (6)
 (5)
 (6)
 (6)
 (9)
 (3)
 (2)
 (1)
 (9)
 (11)
 (7)
 (1)
 (5)
 (1)
 (2)
 (1)
 (3)
 (9)
 (5)
 (3)
 (2)
 (2)
 (5)
 (2)
 (8)
 (6)
 (16)
 (6)
 (8)
 (8)
 (2)
 (1)
 (19)
 (17)
 (7)
 (8)
 (1)
 (4)
 (5)

References
Results (Sport 123)
Weightlifting World Championships Seniors Statistics 

 
World Weightlifting Championships
World Weightlifting Championships
World Weightlifting Championships
International weightlifting competitions hosted by Thailand
World Weightlifting Championships
Sport in Chiang Mai
December 1997 sports events in Thailand